Dongping station, is an interchange station between Guangfo line (FMetro Line 1) and Foshan Metro Line 3 in Foshan's Shunde District. Guangfo Line started operations on 28 December 2016. Line 3 started operations on 28 December 2022.

Station layout

Exits

Exits C, D, E, F

Gallery

References

Foshan Metro stations
Railway stations in China opened in 2016
Guangzhou Metro stations
Shunde District